Colongra is a suburb of the Central Coast region of New South Wales, Australia, on the banks of Lake Munmorah. It is part of the  local government area.

At the 2021 Australian census the population of Colongra was recorded as zero.

References 

Suburbs of the Central Coast (New South Wales)